Robertson House in Hemp Ridge, Kentucky was built in c.1850 and modified c.1900.  It was listed on the National Register of Historic Places in 1988.

It is a two-story brick center passage plan home that includes Greek Revival details in its interior as well as in its exterior.  It has a front portico with two pairs of columns, and pilasters flanking the door.

References

National Register of Historic Places in Shelby County, Kentucky
Houses completed in 1850
Houses in Shelby County, Kentucky
Houses on the National Register of Historic Places in Kentucky
Greek Revival houses in Kentucky
1850 establishments in Kentucky
Central-passage houses